Sarakhiyeh (also Romanized as Sarākhīyeh) is a village in Salami Rural District, Khanafereh District, Shadegan County, Khuzestan Province, Iran. At the 2006 census, its population was 515, in 74 families.

References 

Populated places in Shadegan County